Steven Richardson (born February 28, 1996) is an American-born Canadian football defensive tackle for the BC Lions of the Canadian Football League (CFL). He played college football at Minnesota, and originally signed with the Los Angeles Chargers of the National Football League (NFL) as an undrafted free agent in 2018. He has also played for the Winnipeg Blue Bombers.

College career
Richardson played in 48 games for the University of Minnesota from 2014–17 and recorded 103 defensive tackles, 12.5 sacks, a pair of forced fumbles and a fumble recovery. Led all Golden Gopher defenders with 11 tackles for a loss and seven sacks in 2016 while earning an All-Big Ten Honourable Mention.

Professional career

Los Angeles Chargers 
Richardson spent time on the practice roster of the Los Angeles Chargers in 2018.

Winnipeg Blue Bombers 
Richardson signed with the Winnipeg Blue Bombers of the Canadian Football League (CFL), reuniting with University of Minnesota teammates Chris Streveler and Drew Wolitarsky. Richardson won the 107th Grey Cup in his rookie year, in a game which saw the Bombers defensive line apply constant pressure to Dane Evans and the Hamilton Tiger-Cats as Winnipeg soared to a 33-12 victory.  At  and weighing , Richardson was noted for his low centre of gravity, ability to stop the run, and played a key part getting stops in short yardage situations for the Blue Bombers. Following the cancelled 2020 season Richardson signed a one-year contract extension with the Winnipeg Blue Bombers on February 5, 2021. Richardson won the Grey Cup again in 2021.

BC Lions 
Following the 2021 season, Richardson became a free agent in February 2022 and signed a contract with the BC Lions on February 8, 2022 . On April 20, 2022 the BC Lions announced that Richardson suffered a significant injury which would cause him to miss a large amount of time. The injury was later revealed to be an Achilles injury and there was hope he would be able to return for the end of the 2022 season. However, on October 13, 2022, it was announced that Richardson suffered a setback in his recovery and would not play for the Lions in 2022.

Statistics

CFL

References

External links
Winnipeg Blue Bombers bio

1996 births
Living people
Canadian football defensive linemen
Players of Canadian football from Chicago
Winnipeg Blue Bombers players
Minnesota Golden Gophers football players